is a Japanese actor and voice actor. He is sometimes credited as Masato Eve.

Filmography

Films
 Love Hotel (1985) 
Maison Ikkoku (1986)
Empire of the Sun (1987) – Sgt. Nagata
Sukeban Deka (1987)
Toki o Kakeru Shōjo (1997)
Dr. Akagi (1998)
Taboo (1999)
Godzilla vs. Megaguirus (2000)
Agitator (2001)
Onmyoji II (2003)
Azumi (2003)
Godzilla: Final Wars (2004)
Azumi 2: Death or Love (2005)
Tetsujin 28-go (2005) – Kētarō Taura
Sengoku Jieitai 1549 (2005) – Saitō Dōsan
Sway (2006) – Isamu Hayakawa
Saishū Heiki Kanojo: The Last Love Song on this Little Planet (2006) – Murase
Goemon (2009) – Tokugawa Ieyasu
Space Battleship Yamato (2010) – Desler (voice)
Emperor (2012) – Kōichi Kido
Ask This of Rikyu (2013)
Shield of Straw (2013) – Kenji Sekiya
Black Butler (2014) – Kuzo Shinpei
A Stitch of Life (2015)
Black Widow Business (2016)
Museum (2016) – Toshio Okabe
Flea-picking Samurai (2018)
Kaiji: Final Game (2020)
Independence of Japan (2020) – Hitoshi Ashida
A Winter Rose (2022)

Television drama
 Kasuga no Tsubone (1989) – Ishida Mitsunari
 Hideyoshi (1996) – Kuroda Kanbei
 Fūrin Kazan (2007) – Taigen Sessai
 Detective Conan (2011)
 Crime and Punishment: A Falsified Romance (2012)
 Gunshi Kanbei (2014) – Sen no Rikyū
 Do S Deka (2015) – Tokuji Kondō
 Kabukimono Keiji (2015)
 Shizumanu Taiyō (2016)
 Beppinsan (2016–17)
 Miotsukushi Ryōrichō (2017)
 Segodon (2018) – Tokugawa Nariaki
 Nemesis (2021)
 The Grand Family (2021) – Prime Minister Sahashi
 Life's Punchline (2021)
 Isoroku Yamamoto in London (2021) – Takayoshi Katō
 Uzukawamura Jiken (2022)

Television animation
 The Ultraman (1979–1980) as Ultraman Joneus
 Space Battleship Yamato (1973–1983) – Desler, Heikurō Tōdō
 Dokaben as Kojiro Inukai (1976–1979)
 Space Carrier Blue Noah (1979–1980)

Theatrical animation
 Phoenix 2772 (1980) – Black Jack
 Tōi Umi kara Kita Coo (1993) – Tetsuo Obata
 NiNoKuni (2019) – King Flander

Dubbing
Shrek (2001) – Lord Farquaad
The Godfather (NTV edition) (1976) – Paulie Gatto (Johnny Martino)
Beatles Cartoon (1965) – John Lennon

References

External links

1949 births
Living people
Male actors from Tokyo
Japanese male voice actors
20th-century Japanese male actors
21st-century Japanese male actors